The Little Orphan is a 1917 American silent drama film directed by Jack Conway and starring Ella Hall, Gertrude Astor and Gretchen Lederer. Prints and/or fragments were found in the Dawson Film Find in 1978.

Cast
 Ella Hall as Rene Lescere 
 Jack Conway as David Clark 
 Gertrude Astor as Emmeline Warren 
 Gretchen Lederer as Mrs. Billy Hardwick 
 Dick La Reno as Dick Porter 
 George Webb as Jerry Mathers 
 George Hupp as Henri Pelour
 Chandler House as Jean Bourget, as a child
 Ernest Shields as Jean Bourget 
 Margaret Whistler as Fannie Harrison

References

Bibliography
 James Robert Parish & Michael R. Pitts. Film directors: a guide to their American films. Scarecrow Press, 1974.

External links
 

1917 films
1917 drama films
1910s English-language films
American silent feature films
Silent American drama films
Films directed by Jack Conway
American black-and-white films
Universal Pictures films
1910s American films